90-60-90, diario secreto de una adolescente is a Spanish drama television series that originally aired on Antena 3 from 7 September to 26 October 2009. Set in the fashion world, the plot concerns the relationship between a 42-year-old photographer and a 16-year-old orphan. It stars Esmeralda Moya, Jesús Olmedo, Ana Rujas, and Assumpta Serna, among others.

Premise 
Mel, a 16-year-old girl with a younger sister (Julia), becomes an orphan and thus seeks a job. Together with her friend África, Mel approaches a fashion agency. She enters into a relationship with Bruno, a 42-year-old photographer with a daughter the same age as her.

Cast

Production and release 
Despite actually consisting of 16 episodes featuring a running time of 55 minutes, 90-60-90 was broadcast in double-rounds. The broadcasting run lasted from 7 September 2009 to 26 October 2009.

Awards and nominations 

|-
| align = "center" | 2010 || 19th Actors and Actresses Union Awards || Carmen Arévalo || Best Actress (TV, Minor Performance) ||  || 
|}

References 

Fashion-themed television series
2009 Spanish television series debuts
2009 Spanish television series endings
2000s Spanish drama television series
Spanish-language television shows
Antena 3 (Spanish TV channel) network series
Spanish teen drama television series
Television series about orphans
Television series about teenagers
Television series by Diagonal TV